East Tennessee Blues is an American old-time fiddle song, which dates back to the early 20th century.

Written by Charlie Bowman (born in Gray Station, in East Tennessee), it was first recorded by Al Hopkins, (aka The Hill Billies) in 1926.  Well-known bluegrass artists, such as Bill Monroe, Doc Watson, and Tommy Jackson have released versions of the song.  A mainstay of bluegrass music, the song continues to be performed by singers such as Sierra Hull and the Steep Canyon Rangers, as well as the East Tennessee State University Bluegrass Pride Band.

See also
Music of East Tennessee
Appalachian music

References

Appalachian folk songs
Bill Monroe songs
Bluegrass songs
Music of East Tennessee
Old-time music